The legal system in Scotland grants certain rights to persons accused in criminal proceedings.

Right to retain a personal copy of the complaint document
At all times the accused has the right to retain a copy of the complaint document. The complaint document is marked CITATION and is sent out by the procurator fiscal, the Scottish body responsible for prosecutions.

Right to request precognition interviews of prosecution witnesses
The purpose of a precognition interview is to establish what a witness will say in response to prosecution and defence questions at trial. The accused may request for Police Scotland officers to be precognised.

Right to request precognition of defence witnesses
People who would be helpful for the defence of trial may be requested to provide a precognition interview via the defence solicitor.

Right to call defence witnesses to trial
The accused has the right to request for the defence solicitor to call defence witnesses to trial.

Right to have access to crown witness statements
Some solicitors will email the crown witness statements in full. Other solicitors might provide summary versions of these statements.

Right to serve a "Statement of uncontroversial evidence"
The accused may serve a statement of uncontroversial evidence on the procurator fiscal and the court. A defence solicitor can undertake this on the accused behalf. If the procurator fiscal does not respond the evidence in the statement is taken as proven for the purposes of the trial.

Right to change defence solicitors
If a defence solicitor does not provide legal advice or refuses to undertake requested precognitions, the accused has a right to change solicitors.

Right to complain to the Scottish Legal Complaints Commission (SLCC)
If a solicitor refuses to undertake precognition interviews for the defence of the case the accused has a right to complain to the Scottish Legal Complains Commission.

See also
Corroboration in Scots law
Moorov v HM Advocate
Cadder v HM Advocate

References

External links
The work of precognition agents in criminal cases

Scottish criminal law